Tacumbú is one of the barrios of Asunción and famous for the prison also referred to as "Tacumbú". The famous Tacumbú hill is also located in this neighbourhood. The majority of the streets of the city of Asunción and surrounding areas were cobbled with the rocks extracted from this hill. It is a working-class neighbourhood, located at only five minutes drive from Asuncion's downtown.

Tacumbú Prison
When it first opened in 1956, Tacumbú prison was designed to hold just 800 prisoners, however its capacity was soon increased to hold 1,500 inmates.
Nevertheless by 2020 it was home to 4231 inmates, many sleeping in an outside area on the ground. 
In an interview with a reporter from InSight Crime,
Jorge Fernández, prison director in 2019, pointed out that only 40 to 43 guards are in charge of around 4,000 prisoners, while at least 100 would be required in order to keep the situation under control. In conclusion, the number of guards on duty is not sufficient to stop the circulation of marijuana, cocaine, crack or weapons within Tacumbú. 
Fernández also stated that only about 25% of the inmates have been convicted, while 75% are still awaiting their trial. 
Since Paraguay allows visits to prisons on four days a week (Tuesdays, Thursdays, Saturdays and Sundays), as many as 7,000 visitors from the outside may be admitted simultaneously.
Under these circumstances, it does not seem surprising, that Tacumbú  has a high murder rate. Gang violence include bloody clashes between the Rotela Clan and Primeiro Comando da Capital were responsible for at least 12 confirmed victims during a massacre in 2019.

Under the title "Paraguay: The Most Dangerous Prison on Earth" the British journalist
Raphael Rowe
visited Tacumba prison for the first episode of the fourth season of the documentary
Inside the World's Toughest Prisons

References

 https://insightcrime.org/

Neighbourhoods of Asunción
Prisons in Paraguay
Primeiro Comando da Capital